Tabbouleh, also transcribed tabouleh, tabbouli, tabouli, or taboulah, is a Levantine salad made mostly of finely chopped parsley, with tomatoes, mint, onion, soaked uncooked bulgur, and seasoned with olive oil, lemon juice, salt and sweet pepper. Some variations add lettuce, or use semolina instead of bulgur.

Tabbouleh is traditionally served as part of a mezze in the Eastern Mediterranean and the Arab world. Like hummus, baba ghanoush, pita bread, and other elements of Arab cuisine, tabbouleh has become a popular food in the United States.

Etymology
The Levantine Arabic tabbūle is derived from the Arabic word tābil from the Aramaic root word t-b-l, meaning "seasoning" or more literally "dip". Use of the word in English first appeared in the 1950s.

History
Edible herbs known as qaḍb formed an essential part of the Arab diet in the Middle Ages. Dishes like tabbouleh attest to their continued popularity in Middle Eastern cuisine today. Originally from the mountains of Lebanon and Syria, tabbouleh has become one of the most popular salads in the Middle East. The wheat variety salamouni cultivated in the Beqaa Valley region in Lebanon, was considered (in the mid-19th century) as particularly well-suited for making bulgur, a basic ingredient of tabbouleh. In Lebanon, the Lebanese National Tabbouleh Day is a yearly festivity day dedicated to Tabbouleh. Since 2001, it is celebrated the first Saturday of the month of July.

Regional variations
In the Eastern Mediterranean, particularly Syria, Lebanon, Palestine, Jordan, Egypt, and Iraq, it is usually served as part of a meze. The Syrian and the Lebanese use more parsley than bulgur wheat in their dish. A Turkish variation of the dish known as kısır, and a similar Armenian dish known as eetch use far more bulgur than parsley. Another ancient variant is called terchots. In Cyprus, where the dish was introduced by the Lebanese, it is known as tambouli. In the Dominican Republic, a local version introduced by Syrian and Lebanese immigrants is called Tipile. It is widely popular in Israel.

See also
 List of salads
 List of vegetable dishes
 Kısır
 Eetch
 Fattoush
 Couscous

References

Bibliography

References

Appetizers
Arab cuisine
Bulgur dishes
Lenten foods
Levantine cuisine
Mediterranean cuisine
National dishes
Salads
Vegan cuisine
Vegetable dishes